Chakkavaratty, Chakka Varattiyathu, Chakka Varatti, Jackfruit Preserves or Jackfruit Halwa is a type of food made from jackfruit. The seeds are removed from the fruit and it is cut into small pieces. The fruit is then cooked with ghee and jaggery; it eventually reaches a paste- or jam-like consistency. After cooling it can be eaten; and it keeps for six to ten months. Malayalis prepare ada with this chakkavaratti as a special food.

References

Kerala cuisine
Indian desserts
Fruit dishes